The NCHA men's tournament is an annual Division III conference tournament that has taken place since 1986. The winner of the tournament has received an automatic bit to the NCAA Tournament since they were first offered in 2000.

History
When the NCHA formed in 1981 the NCAA was already holding a preliminary tournament to help determine the bids for the NCAA Tournament. They continued to do so until 1985 after which the western conferences began playing their own postseason tournaments. For the first year the NCHA tournament format was a Two-game, total goal series for both rounds. That was changed to a point system the following year; the teams would play two games against one another and whoever had the most points would advance (2 points for a win, 1 point for a tie). If the two teams were tied after two games than a 20-minute 'mini-game' was played to determine the winner. In 1993 the tournament was expanded to include all 6 teams with all rounds following the same point system format. Two seasons later the tournament was expanded again, this time to 8 teams, before returning to a 6-team championship the following year. In 1997 Bemidji State was no longer eligible to participate in any Division III tournament but remained in the NCHA for three more seasons. The following year the 8-team tournament was restored. When Lake Forest left the conference in 2009 the tournament shifted to a 7-team format but was restored to an 8-team arrangement after membership was reshuffled in 2013.

In 2016 the conference standings were altered by splitting teams into two divisions, North and South. The tournament was also changed to include only six teams, three from each division, with the top teams advancing to the semifinal round. The remaining teams would play within their division for the quarterfinals and then the opposite divisions for the semifinals. Two years later the tournament was returned to an 8-team format, however, the teams would play both the quarterfinal and semifinal rounds within their divisions leaving the championship as the only interdivisional game.

1986

1987

Note: * denotes overtime period(s)Note: Mini-games in italics

1988

Note: * denotes overtime period(s)Note: Mini-games in italics

1989

Note: * denotes overtime period(s)Note: Mini-games in italics

1990

Note: * denotes overtime period(s)Note: Mini-games in italics

1991

Note: * denotes overtime period(s)Note: Mini-games in italics

1992

Note: * denotes overtime period(s)Note: Mini-games in italics

1993

Note: * denotes overtime period(s)Note: Mini-games in italics

1994

Note: * denotes overtime period(s)Note: Mini-games in italics

1995

Note: * denotes overtime period(s)Note: Mini-games in italics

1996

Note: * denotes overtime period(s)Note: Mini-games in italics

1997

Note: * denotes overtime period(s)Note: Mini-games in italics

1998

Note: * denotes overtime period(s)Note: Mini-games in italics

1999

Note: * denotes overtime period(s)Note: Mini-games in italics

2000

Note: * denotes overtime period(s)Note: Mini-games in italics

2001

Note: * denotes overtime period(s)Note: Mini-games in italics

2002

Note: As the top seed, St. Norbert's arena was used for the semifinal and championship rounds.

Note: * denotes overtime period(s)Note: Mini-games in italics

2003

Note: As the top seed, St. Norbert's arena was used for the semifinal and championship rounds.

Note: * denotes overtime period(s)Note: Mini-games in italics

2004

Note: As the top seed, St. Norbert's arena was used for the semifinal and championship rounds.

Note: * denotes overtime period(s)Note: Mini-games in italics

2005

Note: * denotes overtime period(s)Note: Mini-games in italics

2006

Note: * denotes overtime period(s)Note: Mini-games in italics

2007

Note: * denotes overtime period(s)Note: Mini-games in italics

2008

Note: * denotes overtime period(s)Note: Mini-games in italics

2009

Note: * denotes overtime period(s)Note: Mini-games in italics

2010

Note: * denotes overtime period(s)Note: Mini-games in italics

2011

Note: * denotes overtime period(s)Note: Mini-games in italics

2012

Note: * denotes overtime period(s)Note: Mini-games in italics

2013

Note: * denotes overtime period(s)Note: Mini-games in italics

2014

Note: * denotes overtime period(s)Note: Mini-games in italics

2015

Note: * denotes overtime period(s)Note: Mini-games in italics

2016

Note: * denotes overtime period(s)Note: Mini-games in italics

2017

Note: * denotes overtime period(s)

2018

Note: * denotes overtime period(s)Note: Mini-games in italics

2019

Note: * denotes overtime period(s)Note: Mini-games in italics

2020

Note: * denotes overtime period(s)Note: Mini-games in italics

2021

Note: * denotes overtime period(s)Note: Mini-games in italics

2022

Note: * denotes overtime period(s)Note: Mini-games in italics

2023

Note: * denotes overtime period(s)Note: Mini-games in italics

Championships

Current Teams

Former Teams

References

Sources

Ice hockey